Heiwadai Station is the name of two train stations in Japan:

 Heiwadai Station (Chiba)
 Heiwadai Station (Tokyo)